The Saleh Jo Tar Coal Mine is a coal mine located in Sindh. The mine has coal reserves amounting to 2 billion tonnes of coking coal, one of the largest coal reserves in Asia and the world.

See also 
List of mines in Pakistan

References 

Coal mines in Pakistan